Coloconger japonicus is a species of eels in the family Colocongridae (worm eels/short-tail eels). It was described by Yoshihiko Machida in 1984. It is a marine, deep-water dwelling eel which is known from the East China Sea. It dwells at a depth range of 750–760 metres. Males can reach a maximum total length of 56 centimetres.

References

Eels
Taxa named by Yoshihiko Machida
Fish described in 1984